The Pulse of Danger is a 1966 novel written by Australian author Jon Cleary. It is set in Bhutan with the background of the Sino-Indian War. A small group of Western botanists have just finished an expedition and are returning to India where they encounter an Indian officer who has a captured Chinese general. They are pursued by Chinese forces.

Cleary visited the region as part of his research. Film rights were bought by Sydney Box but no movie was made.

References

External links
The Pulse of Danger at AustLit (subscription required)

1966 Australian novels
Bhutan in fiction
Fiction set in 1962
Sino-Indian War in fiction
War novels
William Collins, Sons books
William Morrow and Company books
Novels by Jon Cleary